Zita was a Hittite prince and probably the brother of Suppiluliuma I, (Šuppiluliumaš of the letters), in the 382–letter correspondence called the Amarna letters. The letters were mostly sent to the pharaoh of Egypt from 1350-1335 BC, but other internal letters, vassal-state letters, and epics, also word texts, are part of the letter corpus. Zita had a son called Hatupiyanza.

Zita's letter to the Egyptian pharaoh is addressed to someone at the Egyptian court.

Zita's letter to Egypt

EA 44, title: "From a Hittite prince"
In the Amarna letters, Zita is only referenced in EA 44, his own letter, (EA is for 'el Amarna'). The topic of Zita's letter is his desire for gold, and his sending of a "greeting-gift" as his payment, for a return greeting-gift of gold.

Tablet-letter: EA 44:
"Say to the lord, the king of Egypt-(named: Mizri), my father: Thus Zi[t]a, the king's son, your son.
May all go well with the lord, my father.
On an earlier embassy-(visit) of any of your messengers, they came to Hatti, and when they went back to you, then it was I–that sent greetings to you and had a present brought to you.
...
[...] Herewith [I send on] to you your messengers (coming) [from] Hatti, and I also send to my father my own messengers–along with your messengers, and I send as your greeting-gift a present of 16 men.
I myself am desirous of gold. [M]y father, send me gold. Whatever you, the lord, my father, are desirous of, write me so I can send it to you."  -EA 44, lines 1-29 (lines 14-17+ are missing-(a lacuna))

See also

Suppiluliuma I
Greeting-gift (Šulmānī)
Amarna letters

References
Moran, William L. The Amarna Letters. Johns Hopkins University Press, 1987, 1992. (softcover)

Amarna letters writers
Hittite people
14th-century BC people